Live Shit: Binge & Purge is the first live album by the American heavy metal band Metallica, released in a box set format on November 23, 1993. The initial first pressings contained three CDs or cassette tapes, with songs from concerts in Mexico City on the Nowhere Else to Roam tour, as well as three VHS tapes while a newer version contains two DVDs from concerts in San Diego on the Wherever We May Roam Tour and Seattle on the Damaged Justice Tour. It was originally released as a cardboard box depicting the style of a typical tour equipment transport box. Besides the audio and video media, the box featured additional bonus material (booklet showing photos, typical tour correspondence as sent and received by the band and their management, and internal documents and handwritten notes; a recreated copy of an access pass to the "Snakepit" part of the tour stage; a cardboard drawing/airbrush stencil for the "Scary Guy" logo) and a black "Metalli'Fukin'ca" T-shirt. Live Shit: Binge & Purge has been certified 15× platinum by the RIAA as a long-form video format.

When the set was reissued in 3-CD / 2-DVD format, the box was abandoned in favor of a jewel case format. The booklet that was released in the initial set was made available as DVD-ROM content.

Track listing

Audio CDs
Recorded at the Palacio de los Deportes, Mexico City, Mexico, on February 25, 26, 27, and March 1 and 2, 1993.

VHS/DVD

San Diego
Recorded at the San Diego Sports Arena, San Diego, California, on January 13 and 14, 1992.

VHS one/DVD one

VHS two/DVD one

Seattle
Recorded at the Seattle Coliseum, Seattle, Washington on August 29 and 30, 1989.

VHS three/DVD two

Personnel
Metallica
 James Hetfield – lead vocals, rhythm guitar
 Kirk Hammett – lead guitar, backing vocals
 Jason Newsted – bass, backing vocals, occasional lead vocals 
 Lars Ulrich – drums

Production
 James Hetfield; Lars Ulrich – producers
 Guy Charbonneau; Mick Hughes – engineers
 James "Jimbo" Barton; Kent Matcke; Mike Fraser – mixing
 Scott Humphrey – digital editing

Chart positions

Video certifications

References

Metallica video albums
1993 live albums
1993 compilation albums
1993 video albums
Live video albums
Metallica live albums
Elektra Records live albums
Elektra Records video albums
Elektra Records compilation albums
Vertigo Records compilation albums
Vertigo Records live albums
Vertigo Records video albums
Live thrash metal albums
Albums recorded at the Palacio de los Deportes